Mika Stadium, is a football stadium in Yerevan, Armenia, built between 2006–2007 and opened in 2008. The capacity of the stadium is 7,000 and served as the home ground of Ulisses FC, FC Lokomotiv Yerevan, FC Noah, FC Mika and FC West Armenia, currently used by Armenian women's national team.

History

The construction of the stadium started in 2006 on the location of the former Araks Stadium. It was completed in 2008 and hosted the first ever match on 22 May of the same year between the U-19 national teams of Spain and Ukraine. The match ended-up with a 3–1 victory for the Spaniards. The first ever goal in Mika Stadium was scored by the Ukraine U-19 player Andriy Yarmolenko with a penalty kick at the 18th minute of the match.

FC Mika played their first game in the stadium on 8 June 2008 against Kilikia FC. Mika won the match 1–0 with Stepan Hakobyan becoming the first ever goalscorer of the club at their new stadium, when he scored the winning goal at the 81st minute of the match.

On 5 November 2011, the FC Mika Museum was opened within the complex.

On August 28, 2014, due to the accumulated debts of the owners, the ownership of the stadium was transferred to the Government of Armenia for AMD 9.045 billion (US$22 million).

The stadium is part of the Republican Complex Center for the Developments of Sports run by the Ministry of Sports and Youth Affairs of Armenia, including the Mika Sports Arena, an indoor fitness centre, martial arts school, table tennis hall, mini-football grounds with artificial and natural turf, as well as many other facilities.

References

External links
 Mika stadium at the FC Mika homepage
 Mika Stadium at waelcon.am

Stadium
Football venues in Armenia
Sports venues in Yerevan
Sports venues completed in 2008
2008 establishments in Armenia